"The Uninvited" is an episode of Thunderbirds, a British 1960s Supermarionation television series created by Gerry and Sylvia Anderson and filmed by their production company AP Films (APF) for ITC Entertainment. Written by Alan Fennell and directed by Desmond Saunders, it was first broadcast on ATV Midlands on 2 December 1965 as the tenth episode of Series One. It is the fifth episode in the official running order.

Set in the 2060s, the series follows the exploits of International Rescue, an organisation that uses technologically-advanced rescue vehicles to save human life. The main characters are ex-astronaut Jeff Tracy, founder of International Rescue, and his five adult sons, who pilot the organisation's main vehicles: the Thunderbird machines. "The Uninvited" begins with Thunderbird 1 being attacked by a group of unidentified fighters and crashing in the Sahara. Its pilot, Scott Tracy, is rescued by two archaeologists, who later need International Rescue's help when they become entombed in the Pyramid of Khamandides – home of the hostile tribe that shot down Scott.

In 1992, a comic strip adaptation of "The Uninvited" was published in Fleetway's Thunderbirds: The Comic and the comics album Thunderbirds: Shock Wave. Also that year, the episode was novelised by Dave Morris for Young Corgi Books. In 2004, "The Uninvited" was included on the A&E DVD The Best of Thunderbirds – The Favorite Episodes.

Plot
Scott Tracy (voiced by Shane Rimmer) is flying back to Tracy Island in Thunderbird 1 when he is suddenly attacked by a trio of unidentified fighters. Thunderbird 1 is damaged and crash-lands in the Sahara. On Tracy Island, Jeff (voiced by Peter Dyneley) dispatches Virgil, Brains and Tin-Tin (voiced by David Holliday, David Graham and Christine Finn) in Thunderbird 2 to rescue Scott. In the desert, archaeologists Wilson and Lindsey are returning to their base camp after a fruitless expedition when they come across the shot-down Thunderbird 1. Stopping their all-terrain truck and supply trailer, they treat Scott's injuries until Thunderbird 2 arrives. Later, with Scott convalescent and Thunderbird 1 repaired by Brains, Wilson and Lindsey reveal that they were searching for the lost pyramid of Pharaoh Khamandides. The International Rescue team head back to Tracy Island the next day.

Wilson and Lindsey resume their journey, but frustration gets the better of Wilson. Driving too fast, he causes the coupling between the truck and the trailer to snap. The trailer rolls down a slope and explodes, destroying nearly all of the men's food, water and fuel and damaging their radio. They use the truck's remaining fuel to travel to a waterhole 40 miles away but arrive to find it bone-dry. As a last, desperate resort, the men use the failing radio to send out a distress call to International Rescue. Alan Tracy (voiced by Matt Zimmerman) has just relieved John (voiced by Ray Barrett) as space monitor on Thunderbird 5 when he picks up Wilson and Lindsey's faint transmission. Jeff dispatches Scott in Thunderbird 1 to find and rescue the men.

In the desert, Lindsey spots a mysterious object on the horizon – the lost pyramid of Khamandides. Using the last of their fuel, the men drive up to the pyramid. As Lindsey deciphers hieroglyphs on the side – hailing Khamandides as "Lord of the Eternal Fountain" – a block rises up to form an entrance to the interior. The men proceed but find themselves entombed when the block falls back into place. Deeper inside, they find mounds of treasure. They also discover that the Eternal Fountain is real and drink from it.

Scott arrives at the pyramid and follows Wilson and Lindsey through the one-way door. Lindsey, traumatised by his recent experiences, accuses Scott of trying to steal his new-found riches and pulls a gun on him. A shootout between Lindsey and Scott ensues. Scott loses his gun but is saved by the arrival of two armed men, who blast Lindsey's gun out of his hand, knocking him out. The strangers transport Scott, Wilson and the unconscious Lindsey to the pyramid's control room in a monorail car. This journey takes them over a refinery where men in gas masks are using a highly toxic and explosive gas to refuel fighters identical to those that shot down Scott.

Jeff is concerned by Scott's lack of contact and dispatches Virgil and Gordon (voiced by David Graham) in Thunderbird 2 to investigate. Seeing Thunderbird 2s arrival, the pyramid's inhabitants prepare to attack it with ground-to-air missiles, but before these are launched Wilson punches one of the guards to the floor and Scott, having taken back his gun, shoots several others. A stray bullet hits a control panel, causing the missiles to launch but detonate harmlessly in mid-air. Scott and Wilson take the monorail back to the entrance, with Scott shooting at the refinery workers as they go. The gas is inadvertently released into the refinery, starting a series of explosions. Scott, Wilson and Lindsey, who has just regained consciousness, reach the entrance to find it open and quickly lift off in Thunderbird 1. Thunderbird 1 and Thunderbird 2 clear the area just before the final explosion destroys the pyramid.

Production
"The Uninvited" was the fifth episode of Thunderbirds to be produced. Its working title was "Desert of Danger". Originally filmed in late 1964 as a 25-minute episode, it was extended to 50 minutes in January 1965 to satisfy APF's owner Lew Grade, who had been highly impressed with the pilot episode and ordered all episodes be expanded to fill an hour-long TV timeslot. The additional material for "The Uninvited" consisted of the shoot-down of Thunderbird 1, the rescue of Scott and the character's subsequent recovery on Tracy Island. The filming of these new scenes coincided with the production of "Desperate Intruder" and "30 Minutes After Noon".

Although the pyramid dwellers are never named on screen, the script identified them as the "Zombites". Their aircraft were re-dressed versions of the WASP fighters from Stingray. The model vehicle representing Wilson and Lindsey's desert truck would later appear in "The Mighty Atom", "Martian Invasion" and "Cry Wolf". The shots of Alan launching in Thunderbird 3 to relieve John were recycled from "Sun Probe".

Actor Matt Zimmerman, who voiced Lindsey, fondly remembered the dialogue recording for this episode: "I had to yell and scream, 'Hahaha! You won't take me alive, Tracy!' We had a lot of fun doing that one." The episode marks the first appearance of Grandma Tracy in the series.

Broadcast and reception
First broadcast on 2 December 1965, "The Uninvited" was transmitted as the tenth episode of Thunderbirds for both the series' original run on Associated Television and the majority of 1960s repeat runs. A number of scenes were omitted from the two-part version that was shown in some UK regions.

Critical response
Series co-creator Sylvia Anderson described "The Uninvited" as "good fun but a little too adventurous for our puppet cast", though she praised the episode's special effects.

Tom Fox of Starburst magazine gives "The Uninvited" a rating of five out of five, calling it a "quality episode". He praises the setting as well as the Zombites, whom he describes as "hilarious" and "hardly your average bunch of pyramid-dwelling undead".

Writing for Panini UK, Chris Bentley also comments positively on the episode, stating that it "entertainingly re-shapes the series' format, illustrating the potentially wide variety of stories that can be told within the International Rescue framework." He also commends the episode's use of action.

Marcus Hearn, author of Thunderbirds: The Vault, has mixed views on the episode. He describes the final battle with the Zombites as being "staged in the explosive style of the 1960s James Bond films" but questions Lindsey's fit of homicidal rage against Scott, believing it to be "out of character". Hearn also criticises the Zombites as villains, noting that their hostility and motives for living underground are never explained. He suggests that the plot concerning the quest for a lost pyramid would not have looked out of place in an episode of Stingray.

References

Works cited

External links

1965 British television episodes
Ancient Egypt in fiction
Archaeology in popular culture
Deserts in fiction
Television episodes set in Egypt
Thunderbirds (TV series) episodes